Stacia Hookom (July 22, 1975) is a former American snowboarder and the first woman named to the first U.S. Snowboarding team in 1994–1995 season, with multiple placements (including first) in the FIS Snowboard World Cup and the U.S. Snowboarding Grand Prix. She also has six national championship titles. Hookom retired in 2007 at the age of 31.

Early life and education 
Hookom was born on July 22, 1975, in Denver, Colorado, though she would grow up in Edwards, Colorado, and began skiing at age 3. Around the age of 14, she began snowboarding when she and a friend took a free lesson at Vail Ski Resort, though she would mostly compete in alpine skiing, mixed with some freeriding, until she focused on snowboarding for "better opportunities," entering her first official snowboard competition at 17. She attended the University of Colorado Boulder, where she joined her legacy sorority Alpha Phi, and cites support from her mother and sorority sisters as helping her maintain a strong work ethic and normal lifestyle, respectively. Since she competed through college, she would put classes on hold and return to them when injuries (including an ACL tear) dictated that she would have to stop snowboarding temporarily.

Career 
In 1994, Hookom was the first woman to join the U.S. Snowboarding team. She noted changes in snowboarding throughout her career: "For me, the most difficult change was when breakaway poles were replaced with stubbies in slalom.My favorite event was slalom and the poles gave me my timing and rhythm in the event. So, when we lost the poles the event just was not the same." In an interview at the point of her retirement, she stated that at the beginning, "lots of people still competed in all events. Sometimes the ‘stylers’ would show up and enter the races. I usually did the halfpipe. Now, the sports are so competitive it is really impossible to do them all."

World Championships 
In the 1996 FIS Snowboard World Championships, Hookum started her career by placing 8th for the parallel slalom and 12th for the grand slalom.

World Cup placement statistics 
In the 1995 World Cup, Hookum placed fifth overall for the giant slalom and fourth overall in Half-pipe. Her 2003 7th place finish led the USA at Sapporo in the women's division, with Chris Klug leading the men's in 19th place. Displayed in this table are World Cup placements that are either notable or her best of that season:

National titles 
Hookom has multiple national championship titles for the U.S. Snowboarding Grand Prix. In 2002, she won two titles in that year's race alone. Displayed in this table are her placements:

Listed are her placements in the Nor-Am Cup for snowboarding:

Retirement 
In January 2007, Hookum retired at age 31 and returned to the University of Colorado Boulder to finish her degree. She moved to Houston, Texas, and planned on going to school to become a physician assistant; she stated that she would like to coach but her geographical location made that difficult.

References 

1975 births
People from Denver
American female snowboarders
University of Colorado Boulder alumni
Living people
21st-century American women